Domes were a characteristic element of the architecture of Ancient Rome and of its medieval continuation, the Byzantine Empire. They had widespread influence on contemporary and later styles, from Russian and Ottoman architecture to the Italian Renaissance and modern revivals. The domes were customarily hemispherical, although octagonal and segmented shapes are also known, and they developed in form, use, and structure over the centuries. Early examples rested directly on the rotunda walls of round rooms and featured a central oculus for ventilation and light. Pendentives became common in the Byzantine period, provided support for domes over square spaces.

Early wooden domes are known only from a literary source, but the use of wooden formwork, concrete, and unskilled labor enabled domes of monumental size in the late Republic and early Imperial period, such as the so-called "Temple of Mercury" bath hall at Baiae. Nero introduced the dome into Roman palace architecture in the 1st century and such rooms served as state banqueting halls, audience rooms, or throne rooms. The Pantheon's dome, the largest and most famous example, was built of concrete in the 2nd century and may have served as an audience hall for Hadrian. Imperial mausolea, such as the Mausoleum of Diocletian, were domed beginning in the 3rd century. Some smaller domes were built with a technique of using ceramic tubes in place of a wooden centering for concrete, or as a permanent structure embedded in the concrete, but light brick became the preferred building material over the course of the 4th and 5th centuries. Brick ribs allowed for a thinner structure and facilitated the use of windows in the supporting walls, replacing the need for an oculus as a light source.

Christian baptisteries and shrines were domed in the 4th century, such as the Lateran Baptistery and the likely wooden dome over the Church of the Holy Sepulchre. Constantine's octagonal church in Antioch may have been a precedent for similar buildings for centuries afterward. The first domed basilica may have been built in the 5th century, with a church in southern Turkey being the earliest proposed example, but the 6th century architecture of Justinian made domed church architecture standard throughout the Roman east. His Hagia Sophia and Church of the Holy Apostles inspired copies in later centuries.

Cruciform churches with domes at their crossings, such as the churches of Hagia Sophia in Thessaloniki and St. Nicholas at Myra, were typical of 7th and 8th century architecture and bracing a dome with barrel vaults on four sides became the standard structural system. Domes over windowed drums of cylindrical or polygonal shape were standard after the 9th century. In the empire's later period, smaller churches were built with smaller diameter domes, normally less than  after the 10th century. Exceptions include the 11th century domed-octagons of Hosios Loukas and Nea Moni, and the 12th century Chora Church, among others. The cross-in-square plan, with a single dome at the crossing or five domes in a quincunx pattern, as at the Church of St. Panteleimon, was the most popular type from the 10th century until the fall of Constantinople in 1453.

Overview 
Rounded arches, vaults, and domes distinguish Roman architecture from that of Ancient Greece and were facilitated by the use of concrete and brick. By varying the weight of the aggregate material in the concrete, the weight of the concrete could be altered, allowing lighter layers to be laid at the top of concrete domes. But concrete domes also required expensive wooden formwork, also called shuttering, to be built and kept in place during the curing process, which would usually have to be destroyed to be removed. Formwork for brick domes need not be kept in place as long and could be more easily reused. The mortar and aggregate of Roman concrete was built up in horizontal layers laid by hand against wooden form-work with the thickness of the layers determined by the length of the workday, rather than being poured into a mold as concrete is today. Roman concrete domes were thus built similarly to the earlier corbel domes of the Mediterranean region, although they have different structural characteristics. The aggregate used by the Romans was often rubble, but lightweight aggregate in the upper levels served to reduce stresses. Empty "vases and jugs" could be hidden inside to reduce weight.  The dry concrete mixtures used by the Romans were compacted with rams to eliminate voids, and added animal blood acted as a water reducer. Because Roman concrete was weak in tension, it did not provide any structural advantage over the use of brick or stone. But, because it could be constructed with unskilled slave labor, it provided a constructional advantage and facilitated the building of large-scale domes.

Roman domes were used in baths, villas, palaces, and tombs. Oculi were common features. They were customarily hemispherical in shape and partially or totally concealed on the exterior. In order to buttress the horizontal thrusts of a large hemispherical masonry dome, the supporting walls were built up beyond the base to at least the haunches of the dome and the dome was then also sometimes covered with a conical or polygonal roof. A variety of other shapes, including shallow saucer domes, segmental domes, and ribbed domes were also sometimes used. The audience halls of many imperial palaces were domed. Domes were also very common over polygonal garden pavilions. Domes were "closely associated with senatorial, imperial, and state-sponsored patrons" and proliferated in the capital cities and other cities with imperial affiliations. Construction and development of domes declined in the west with the decline and fall of the western portion of the empire.

In Byzantine architecture, a supporting structure of four arches with pendentives between them allowed the spaces below domes to be opened up. Pendentives allowed for weight loads to be concentrated at just four points on a more practical square plan, rather than a circle. Until the 9th century, domes were low with thick buttressing and did not project much into the exterior of their buildings. Drums were cylindrical when used and likewise low and thick. After the 9th century, domes were built higher and used polygonal drums decorated with engaged columns and arcades. Exterior dome decoration was more elaborate by the 12th century and included engaged columns along with niches, blind arcades, and string courses. Multiple domes on a single building were normal.

Domes were important elements of baptisteries, churches, and tombs. They were normally hemispherical and had, with occasional exceptions, windowed drums. Roofing for domes ranged from simple ceramic tile to more expensive, more durable, and more form-fitting lead sheeting. The domes and drums typically incorporated wooden tension rings at several levels to resist deformation in the mortar and allow for faster construction. Metal clamps between stone cornice blocks, metal tie rods, and metal chains were also used to stabilize domed buildings. Timber belts at the bases of domes helped to stabilize the walls below them during earthquakes, but the domes themselves remained vulnerable to collapse. The surviving ribbed or pumpkin dome examples in Constantinople are structurally equivalent and those techniques were used interchangeably, with the number of divisions corresponding to the number of windows. Aided by the small scale of churches after the 6th century, such ribbed domes could be built with formwork only for the ribs. Pumpkin domes could have been built in self-supporting rings and small domical vaults were effectively corbelled, dispensing with formwork altogether.

History

Late Republic and early Imperial period 
Roman baths played a leading role in the development of domed construction in general, and monumental domes in particular. Modest domes in baths dating from the 2nd and 1st centuries BC are seen in Pompeii, in the cold rooms of the Terme Stabiane and the Terme del Foro. These domes are very conical in shape, similar to those on an Assyrian bas-relief found in Nineveh. At a Roman era tepidarium in Cabrera de Mar, Spain, a dome has been identified from the middle of the 2nd century BC that used a refined version of the parallel arch construction found in an earlier Hellenistic bath dome in Sicily. According to Vitruvius, the temperature and humidity of domed warm rooms could be regulated by raising or lowering bronze discs located under an oculus. Domes were particularly well suited to the hot rooms of baths circular in plan to facilitate even heating from the walls. However, the extensive use of domes did not occur before the 1st century AD.

Varro's book on agriculture describes an aviary with a wooden dome decorated with the eight winds that is compared by analogy to the eight winds depicted on the Tower of the Winds, which was built in Athens at about the same time. This aviary with its wooden dome may represent a fully developed type. Wooden domes in general would have allowed for very wide spans. Their earlier use may have inspired the development and introduction of large stone domes of previously unprecedented size. Complex wooden forms were necessary for dome centering and support during construction, and they seem to have eventually become more efficient and standardized over time.

Domes reached monumental size in the Roman Imperial period. The building, actually a concrete frigidarium pool for a bathhouse, dates to either the late Roman Republic, or the reign of the first emperor Augustus (27 BC – 14 AD), making it the first large Roman dome. There are five openings in the dome: a circular oculus and four square skylights. It is also the earliest preserved concrete dome.

First century 
While there are earlier examples in the Republican period and early Imperial period, the growth of domed construction increased under Emperor Nero and the Flavians in the 1st century AD, and during the 2nd century. Centrally planned halls become increasingly important parts of palace and palace villa layouts beginning in the 1st century, serving as state banqueting halls, audience rooms, or throne rooms. Formwork was arranged either horizontally or radially, but there is not enough surviving evidence from the 1st and 2nd centuries to say what was typical.

The opulent palace architecture of the Emperor Nero (54 – 68 AD) marks an important development. There is evidence of a dome in his Domus Transitoria at the intersection of two corridors, resting on four large piers, which may have had an oculus at the center. In Nero's Domus Aurea, or "Golden House", planned by Severus and Celer, the walls of a large octagonal room transition to an octagonal domical vault, which then transitions to a dome with an oculus. This is the earliest known example of a dome in the city of Rome itself.

This octagonal and semicircular dome is made of concrete and the oculus is made of brick. The radial walls of the surrounding rooms buttress the dome, allowing the octagonal walls directly beneath it to contain large openings under flat arches and for the room itself to be unusually well lit. Because there is no indication that mosaic or other facing material had ever been applied to the surface of the dome, it may have been hidden behind a tent-like fabric canopy like the pavilion tents of Hellenistic (and earlier Persian) rulers. The oculus is unusually large, more than two-fifths the span of the room, and it may have served to support a lightweight lantern structure or tholos, which would have covered the opening. Circular channels on the upper surface of the oculus also support the idea that this lantern, perhaps itself domed, was the rotating dome referred to in written accounts.

According to Suetonius, the Domus Aurea had a dome that perpetually rotated on its base in imitation of the sky. It was reported in 2009 that newly discovered foundations of a round room may be those of a rotating domed dining hall. Also reported in contemporary sources is a ceiling over a dining hall in the palace fitted with pipes so that perfume could rain from the ceiling, although it is not known whether this was a feature of the same dome. The expensive and lavish decoration of the palace caused such scandal that it was abandoned soon after Nero's death and public buildings such as the Baths of Titus and the Colosseum were built at the site.

Domitian's 92 AD Domus Augustana established the apsidal semi-dome as an imperial motif. Square chambers in his palace on the Palatine Hill used pendentives to support domes. His palace contained three domes resting over walls with alternating apses and rectangular openings. An octagonal domed hall existed in the domestic wing. Unlike Nero's similar octagonal dome, its segments extended all the way to the oculus. The dining hall of this private palace, called the Coenatio Jovis, or Dining Hall of Jupiter, contained a rotating ceiling like the one Nero had built, but with stars set into the simulated sky.

Second century 
During the reign of Emperor Trajan, domes and semi-domes over exedras were standard elements of Roman architecture, possibly due to the efforts of Trajan's architect, Apollodorus of Damascus, who was famed for his engineering ability. The architecture of Trajan's successor, Hadrian, continued this style.

The Pantheon in Rome, completed by Emperor Hadrian as part of the Baths of Agrippa, has the most famous, best preserved, and largest Roman dome. Its diameter was more than twice as wide as any known earlier dome. Although considered an example of Hadrianic architecture, there is brickstamp evidence that the rebuilding of the Pantheon in its present form was begun under Trajan. Speculation that the architect of the Pantheon was Apollodorus has not been proven, although there are stylistic commonalities between his large coffered half-domes at Trajan's Baths and the dome of the Pantheon. Other indicators that the designer was either Apollodorus or someone in his circle who was "closer in artistic sensibility to Trajan’s era than Hadrian’s" are the monumental size and the incorporation of tiny passages in the structure. The building's dimensions seem to reference Archimedes' treatise On the Sphere and Cylinder, the dome may use rows of 28 coffers because 28 was considered by the Pythagoreans to be a perfect number, and the design balances its complexity with underlying geometrical simplicity. This rotunda, made of brick-faced concrete, contains a large number of relieving arches and voids. Seven interior niches and the entrance way divide the wall structurally into eight virtually independent piers. These openings and additional voids account for a quarter of the rotunda wall's volume. The only opening in the dome is the brick-lined oculus at the top,  in diameter, that provides light and ventilation for the interior.

The shallow coffering in the dome accounts for a less than five percent reduction in the dome's mass, and is mostly decorative. The aggregate material hand-placed in the concrete is heaviest at the base of the dome and changes to lighter materials as the height increases, dramatically reducing the stresses in the finished structure. In fact, many commentators have cited the Pantheon as an example of the revolutionary possibilities for monolithic architecture provided by the use of Roman pozzolana concrete. However, vertical cracks seem to have developed very early, such that in practice the dome acts as an array of arches with a common keystone, rather than as a single unit. The exterior step-rings used to compress the "haunches" of the dome, which would not be necessary if the dome acted as a monolithic structure, may be an acknowledgement of this by the builders themselves. Such buttressing was common in Roman arch construction. The cracks in the dome can be seen from the upper internal chambers of the rotunda, but have been covered by re-rendering on the inside surface of the dome and by patching on the outside of the building. The Pantheon's roof was originally covered with gilt bronze tiles, but these were removed in 663 by Emperor Constans II and replaced with lead roofing.

The function of the Pantheon remains an open question. Strangely for a temple, its inscription, which attributes this third building at the site to the builder of the first, Marcus Agrippa, does not mention any god or group of gods. Its name, Pantheon, comes from the Greek for "all gods" but is unofficial, and it was not included in the list of temples restored by Hadrian in the Historia Augusta. Circular temples were small and rare, and Roman temples traditionally allowed for only one divinity per room. The Pantheon more resembles structures found in imperial palaces and baths. Hadrian is believed to have held court in the rotunda using the main apse opposite the entrance as a tribune, which may explain its very large size. The Pergamon dome was about 80 Roman feet wide, versus about 150 for the Pantheon, and made of brick over a cut stone rotunda. The Ostia dome was 60 Roman feet wide and made of brick-faced concrete. No later dome built in the Imperial era came close to the span of the Pantheon. It remained the largest dome in the world for more than a millennium and is still the world's largest unreinforced concrete dome.

Use of concrete facilitated the complex geometry of the octagonal domed hall at the 2nd century Small Thermal Baths of Hadrian's Villa in Tivoli. The vaulting has collapsed, but a virtual reconstruction suggests that the walls of the octagonal hall, which alternate flat and convex, merged into a spherical cap. Segmented domes made of radially concave wedges, or of alternating concave and flat wedges, appear under Hadrian in the 2nd century and most preserved examples of the style date from this period. Hadrian's villa has examples at the Piazza D'Oro and in the semidome of the Serapeum. Recorded details of the decoration of the segmented dome at the Piazza D'Oro suggests it was made to evoke a billowing tent, perhaps in imitation of the canopies used by Hellenistic kings. Other examples exist at the Hadrianic baths of Otricoli and the so-called "Temple of Venus" at Baiae. This style of dome required complex centering and radially oriented formwork to create its tight curves, and the earliest surviving direct evidence of radial formwork is found at the caldarium of the Large Baths at Hadrian's villa. Hadrian was an amateur architect and it was apparently domes of Hadrian's like these that Trajan's architect, Apollodorus of Damascus, derisively called "pumpkins" prior to Hadrian becoming emperor. According to Dio Cassius, the memory of this insult contributed to Hadrian as emperor having Apollodorus exiled and killed.

In the middle of the 2nd century, some of the largest domes were built near present-day Naples, as part of large bath complexes taking advantage of the volcanic hot springs in the area. At the bath complex at Baiae, there are remains of a collapsed dome spanning , called the "Temple of Venus", and a larger half-collapsed dome spanning  called the "Temple of Diana". The dome of the "Temple of Diana", which may have been a nymphaeum as part of the bath complex, can be seen to have had an ogival section made of horizontal layers of mortared brick and capped with light tufa. It dates to the second half of the 2nd century and is the third largest dome known from the Roman world. The second largest is the collapsed "Temple of Apollo" built nearby along the shore of Lake Avernus.

Octagonal rooms of the Baths of Antoninus in Carthage were covered with cloister vaults and have been dated to 145–160.

In the second half of the 2nd century in North Africa, a distinctive type of nozzle tube shape was developed in the tradition of the terracotta tube dome at the Hellenistic era baths of Morgantina, an idea that had been preserved in the use of interlocking terracotta pots for kiln roofs. This tube could be mass-produced on potter's wheels and interlocked to form a permanent centering for concrete domes, avoiding the use of wooden centering altogether. This spread mainly in the western Mediterranean.

Although rarely used, the pendentive dome was known in 2nd century Roman architecture and possibly earlier, in funerary monuments such as the Sedia dei Diavolo and the Torracio della Secchina on the Via Nomentana. Pendentive domes would be used much more widely in the Byzantine period. A "Roman tomb in Palestine at Kusr-en-Nêuijîs" had a pendentive dome over the square intersection of cruciform barrel vaults and has been dated to the 2nd century. A small dome on spherical pendentives at Beurey-Beauguay on the Côte-d'Or department of France has been dated to the 2nd or 3rd century.

Third century 

The large rotunda of the Baths of Agrippa, the oldest public baths in Rome, has been dated to the Severan period at the beginning of the 3rd century, but it is not known whether this is an addition or simply a reconstruction of an earlier domed rotunda.

In the 3rd century, imperial mausolea began to be built as domed rotundas rather than tumulus structures or other types, following similar monuments by private citizens. Pagan and Christian domed mausolea from this time can be differentiated in that the structures of the buildings also reflect their religious functions. The pagan buildings are typically two story, dimly lit, free-standing structures with a lower crypt area for the remains and an upper area for devotional sacrifice. Christian domed mausolea contain a single well-lit space and are usually attached to a church. The first St. Peter's Basilica would later be built near a preexisting early 3rd century domed rotunda that may have been a mausoleum. In the 5th century the rotunda would be dedicated to St. Andrew and joined to the Mausoleum of Honorius.

Examples from the 3rd century include the brick dome of the Mausoleum of Diocletian, and the mausoleum at Villa Gordiani. The Villa Gordiani also contains remains of an oval gored dome. The Mausoleum of Diocletian uses small arched squinches of brick built up from a circular base in an overlapping scales pattern, called a "stepped squinches dome". The scales pattern was a popular Hellenistic motif adopted by the Parthians and Sasanians, and such domes are likely related to Persian "squinch vaults". In addition to the mausoleum, the Palace of Diocletian also contains a rotunda near the center of the complex that may have served as a throne room. It has side niches similar to those of an octagonal mausoleum but was located at the end of an apparently barrel-vaulted hall like the arrangement found in later Sasanian palaces.

Masonry domes were less common in the Roman provinces, although the 3rd century "Temple of Venus" at Baalbek was built with a stone dome  in diameter. It was destroyed in 1743.

The technique of building lightweight domes with interlocking hollow ceramic tubes further developed in North Africa and Italy in the late 3rd and early 4th centuries. By the 4th century, the thin and lightweight tubed vaulting had become a vaulting technique in its own right, rather than simply serving as a permanent centering for concrete. It was used in early Christian buildings in Italy. Arranging these terracotta tubes in a continuous spiral created a dome that was not strong enough for very large spans, but required only minimal centering and formwork. The later dome of the Baptistry of Neon in Ravenna is an example.

Fourth century 

In the 4th century, Roman domes proliferated due to changes in the way domes were constructed, including advances in centering techniques and the use of brick ribbing. The so-called "Temple of Minerva Medica", for example, used brick ribs along with step-rings and lightweight pumice aggregate concrete to form a decagonal dome. The material of choice in construction gradually transitioned during the 4th and 5th centuries from stone or concrete to lighter brick in thin shells. The use of ribs stiffened the structure, allowing domes to be thinner with less massive supporting walls. Windows were often used in these walls and replaced the oculus as a source of light, although buttressing was sometimes necessary to compensate for large openings. The Mausoleum of Santa Costanza has windows beneath the dome and nothing but paired columns beneath that, using a surrounding barrel vault to buttress the structure.

The  dome of the Mausoleum of Galerius was built around 300 AD close to the imperial palace as either a mausoleum or a throne room. It was converted into a church in the 5th century. Also in Thessaloniki, at the Tetrarchic palace, an octagonal building has been excavated with a 24.95 meter span that may have been used as a throne room. It is known not to have been used as a church and was unsuitable as a mausoleum, and was used for some period between about 311 and when it was destroyed before about 450. The octagonal "Domus Aurea", or "Golden Octagon", built by Emperor Constantine in 327 at the imperial palace of Antioch likewise had a domical roof, presumably of wood and covered with gilded lead. It was dedicated two years after the Council of Nicea to "Harmony, the divine power that unites Universe, Church, and Empire". It may have been both the cathedral of Antioch as well as the court church of Constantine, and the precedent for the later octagonal plan churches near palaces of Saints Sergius and Bacchus and Hagia Sophia by Justinian and Aachen Cathedral by Charlemagne. The dome was rebuilt by 537–8 with cypress wood from Daphne after being destroyed in a fire. Most domes on churches in the Syrian region were built of wood, like that of the later Dome of the Rock in Jerusalem, and the dome of the Domus Aurea survived a series of earthquakes in the 6th century that destroyed the rest of the building. There is no record of the church being rebuilt after the earthquake of 588, perhaps due to the general abandonment of many public buildings in what was no longer a capital of the Empire.

Constantine built the Church of the Nativity in Bethlehem around 333 as a large basilica with an octagonal structure at the eastern end, over the cave said to be the birthplace of Jesus. The domed octagon had an external diameter of 18 meters. It was later destroyed and when rebuilt by Justinian the octagon was replaced with a tri-apsidal structure.

Centralized buildings of circular or octagonal plan also became used for baptistries and reliquaries due to the suitability of those shapes for assembly around a single object. Baptisteries began to be built in the manner of domed mausolea during the 4th century in Italy. The octagonal Lateran Baptistery or the baptistery of the Holy Sepulchre may have been the first, and the style spread during the 5th century. In the second half of the fourth century, domed octagonal baptisteries similar to the form of contemporary imperial mausolea developed in the region of North Italy near Milan. Part of a baths complex begun in the early 4th century, the brick Church of St. George in Sofia was a caldarium that was converted in the middle of the fifth century. It is a rotunda with four apse niches in the corners. The best preserved example of Roman architecture in the city, it has been used as a baptistery, church, mosque, and mausoleum over the centuries. The dome rises to about 14 m from the floor with a diameter of about 9.5m. Its original function as a hypocaust hall is disputed and, based on its form, the building may originally have been a Christian martyrium. It was half-destroyed by the Huns in 447 and was rebuilt in the 11th century.

Domes over the calderia, or hot rooms, of the older Baths of Agrippa and the Baths of Caracalla were also rebuilt at this time. Between the second half of the 4th century and the middle of the 5th century, domed mausolea for wealthy families were built attached to a new type of martyrial basilica before burials within the basilica itself, closer to the martyr's remains, made such attached buildings obsolete. A pagan rotunda from this period located on the Via Sacra was later incorporated into the Basilica of Saints Cosmas and Damian as a vestibule around 526.

Christian mausolea and shrines developed into the "centralized church" type, often with a dome over a raised central space. The Church of the Holy Apostles, or Apostoleion, probably planned by Constantine but built by his successor Constantius in the new capital city of Constantinople, combined the congregational basilica with the centralized shrine. With a similar plan to that of the Church of Saint Simeon Stylites, four naves projected from a central rotunda containing Constantine's tomb and spaces for the tombs of the twelve Apostles. Above the center may have been a clerestory with a wooden dome roofed with bronze sheeting and gold accents. The oblong decagon of today's St. Gereon's Basilica in Cologne, Germany, was built upon an extraordinary and richly decorated 4th century Roman building with an apse, semi-domed niches, and dome. A church built in the city's northern cemetery, its original dedication is unknown. It may have been built by Julianus, the governor of Gaul from 355 to 360 who would later become emperor, as a mausoleum for his family. The oval space may have been patterned after imperial audience halls or buildings such as the Temple of Minerva Medica.

The largest centrally planned Early Christian church, Milan's San Lorenzo Maggiore, was built in the middle of the 4th century while that city served as the capital of the Western Empire and may have been domed with a light material, such as timber or cane. There are two theories about the shape of this dome: a Byzantine-style dome on spherical pendentives with a ring of windows similar to domes of the later Justinian era, or an octagonal cloister vault following Roman trends and like the vaulting over the site's contemporary chapel of Saint Aquiline, possibly built with vaulting tubes, pieces of which had been found in excavations. Although these tubes have been shown to date from a medieval reconstruction, there is evidence supporting the use of Roman concrete in the original. Alternatively, the central covering may have been a square groin vault. The building may have been the church of the nearby imperial palace and a proposed construction between 355-374 under the Arian bishop Auxentius of Milan, who later "suffered a kind of damnatio memoriae at the hands of his orthodox successors", may explain the lack of records about it. Fires in 1071 and 1075 damaged the building and the central covering collapsed in 1103. It was rebuilt with a Romanesque dome that lasted until 1573, when it collapsed and was replaced by the present structure. The original vaulting was concealed by a square drum externally rather than the octagon of today, which dates from the 16th century.

The Church of the Holy Sepulchre in Jerusalem was likely built with a wooden dome over the shrine by the end of the 4th century. The rotunda,  in diameter and centered on the tomb of Christ, consisted of a domed center room surrounded by an ambulatory. The dome rose over a ground floor, gallery, and clerestory and may have had an oculus. Razed to the ground in 1009 by the Fatimid Caliph, it was rebuilt in 1048 by Emperor Constantine IX Monomachos, reportedly with a mosaic depicting Christ and the Twelve Apostles. The current dome is a 1977 renovation in thin reinforced concrete.

Fifth century 

By the 5th century, structures with small-scale domed cross plans existed across the Christian world. Examples include the Mausoleum of Galla Placidia, the martyrium attached to the Basilica of San Simpliciano, and churches in Macedonia and on the coast of Asia Minor. In Italy, the Baptistery of San Giovanni in Naples and the Church of Santa Maria della Croce in Casarano have surviving early Christian domes. In Tolentino, the mausoleum of Catervus was modeled on the Pantheon, but at one-quarter scale and with three protruding apses, around 390-410. The Baptistery of Neon in Ravenna was completed in the middle of the 5th century and there were 5th century domes in the baptisteries at Padula and Novara. Small brick domes are also found in towers of Constantinople's early 5th century land walls. Underground cisterns in Constantinople, such as the Cistern of Philoxenos and the Basilica Cistern, were composed of a grid of columns supporting small domes, rather than groin vaults. The square bay with an overhead sail vault or dome on pendentives became the basic unit of architecture in the early Byzantine centuries, found in a variety of combinations.

Early examples of Byzantine domes existed over the hexagonal hall of the Palace of Antiochos, the hexagon at Gülhane, the martyium of Sts. Karpos and Papylos, and the rotunda at the Myrelaion. The 5th century St. Mary's church in Ephesus had small rectangular side rooms with sail vaults made of arched brick courses. The brick dome of the baptistery at St. Mary's was composed of a series of tightly arched meridional sections.

In the city of Rome, at least 58 domes in 44 buildings are known to have been built before domed construction ended in the middle of the 5th century. The last imperial domed mausoleum in the city was that of Emperor Honorius, built in 415 next to St. Peter's Basilica. It was demolished in 1519 as part of the rebuilding of St. Peter's, but had a dome 15.7 meters wide and its appearance is known from some images. The last domed church in the city of Rome for centuries was Santo Stefano al Monte Celio around 460. Although they continued to be built elsewhere in Italy, domes would not be built again within Rome until 1453.

The Church of the Kathisma was built along the road from Jerusalem to Bethlehem around 456 with an octagonal plan. It was built over the site of a rock said to be used as a seat by the Virgin Mary as she traveled to Bethlehem while pregnant with Jesus, corresponding to a story told in the Protoevangelium of James. The outer diameter was similar to that of the Church of the Holy Sepulchur at 26–27 meters, and the innermost octagon supported a dome 15.5 meters wide.

With the end of the Western Roman Empire, domes became a signature feature of the church architecture of the surviving Eastern Roman Empire. A transition from timber-roofed basilicas to vaulted churches seems to have occurred there between the late 5th century and the 7th century, with early examples in Constantinople, Asia Minor, and Cilicia. The first known domed basilica may have been a church at Meriamlik in southern Turkey, dated to between 471 and 494, although the ruins do not provide a definitive answer. It is possible earlier examples existed in Constantinople, where it has been suggested that the plan for the Meriamlik church itself was designed, but no domed basilica has been found there before the 6th century.

Sixth century 
The 6th century marks a turning point for domed church architecture. Centrally planned domed churches had been built since the 4th century for very particular functions, such as palace churches or martyria, with a slight widening of use around 500 AD, but most church buildings were timber-roofed halls on the basilica plan. The Church of St. Polyeuctus in Constantinople (524–527) may have been built as a large and lavish domed basilica similar to the Meriamlik church of fifty years before—and to the later Hagia Irene of Emperor Justinian—by Anicia Juliana, a descendant of the former imperial house, although the linear walls suggest a timber roof, rather than a brick dome. There is a story that she used the contribution to public funds that she had promised Justinian on his ascension to the throne to roof her church in gold. The church included an inscription praising Juliana for having "surpassed Solomon" with the building, and it may have been with this in mind that Justinian would later say of his Hagia Sophia, "Solomon, I have vanquished thee!".

In the second third of the 6th century, church building by the Emperor Justinian used the domed cross unit on a monumental scale, in keeping with Justinian's emphasis on bold architectural innovation. His church architecture emphasized the central dome and his architects made the domed brick-vaulted central plan standard throughout the Roman east. This divergence with the Roman west from the second third of the 6th century may be considered the beginning of a "Byzantine" architecture. Timber-roofed basilicas, which had previously been the standard church form, would continue to be so in the medieval west.

The earliest existing of Justinian's domed buildings may be the central plan Church of Saints Sergius and Bacchus in Constantinople, completed by 536. It is called the "Little Hagia Sophia" mosque today, but may have been begun five years earlier than that building. The dome rests on an octagonal base created by eight arches on piers and is divided into sixteen sections. Those sections above the flat sides of the octagon are flat and contain a window at their base, alternating with sections from the corners of the octagon that are scalloped, creating an unusual kind of pumpkin dome. Its dates of construction are disputed and may have begun in 532. The alternating scalloped and flat surfaces of the current dome resemble those in Hadrian's half-dome Serapeum in Tivoli, but may have replaced an original drum and dome similar to that over the Basilica of San Vitale in Ravenna. The building was built within the precinct of the Palace of Hormistas, the residence of Justinian before his ascension to the throne in 527, and includes an inscription mentioning the "sceptered Justinian" and "God-crowned Theodora".

The city of Ravenna, Italy, had served as the capital of the Western Roman Empire after Milan from 402 and the capital of the subsequent kingdoms of Odoacer and of Theodoric until Justinian's reconquest in 540. An octagonal building in Ravenna, begun under Theodoric in 525, was completed under the Byzantines in 547 as the Basilica of San Vitale and contains a terracotta dome. It may belong to a school of architecture from 4th and 5th century Milan. The building is similar to the Byzantine Church of Saints Sergius and Bacchus and the later Chrysotriklinos, or throne hall and palace church of Constantinople, and it would be used as the model for Charlemagne's palace chapel at Aix-la-Chapelle. Hollow amphorae were fitted inside one another to provide a lightweight structure for the dome and avoid additional buttressing. The amphorae were arranged in a continuous spiral, which required minimal centering and formwork but was not strong enough for large spans. The dome was covered with a timber roof, which would be the favored practice for later medieval architects in Italy although it was unusual at the time.

After the Nika Revolt destroyed much of the city of Constantinople in 532, including the churches of Hagia Sophia ("Holy Wisdom") and Hagia Irene ("Holy Peace"), Justinian had the opportunity to rebuild. Both had been basilica plan churches and both were rebuilt as domed basilicas, although the Hagia Sophia was rebuilt on a much grander scale. Built by Anthemius of Tralles and Isidore of Miletus in Constantinople between 532 and 537, the Hagia Sophia has been called the greatest building in the world. It is an original and innovative design with no known precedents in the way it covers a basilica plan with dome and semi-domes. Periodic earthquakes in the region have caused three partial collapses of the dome and necessitated repairs. The precise shape of the original central dome completed in 537 was significantly different from the current one and, according to contemporary accounts, much bolder.

Procopius wrote that the original dome seemed "not to rest upon solid masonry, but to cover the space with its golden dome suspended from heaven." Byzantine chronicler John Malalas reported that this dome was 20 byzantine feet lower than its replacement. One theory is that the original dome continued the curve of the existing pendentives (which were partially reconstructed after its collapse), creating a massive sail vault pierced with a ring of windows. This vault would have been part of a theoretical sphere  in diameter (the distance from the base of one pendentive to the base of the one opposite), 7 percent greater than the span of the Pantheon's dome. Another theory raises the shallow cap of this dome (the portion above what are today the pendentives) on a relatively short recessed drum containing the windows. This first dome partially collapsed due to an earthquake in 558 and the design was then revised to the present profile. Earthquakes also caused partial collapses of the dome in 989 and 1346, so that the present dome consists of portions dating from the 6th century, on the north and south sides, and portions from the 10th and 14th centuries on the west and east sides, respectively. There are irregularities where these sectors meet.

Four of the windows were blocked as part of repairs in the 10th century. The ring of windows at the base of the central dome are in the portion where the greatest hoop tension would have been expected and so they may have been used to help alleviate cracking along the meridians. Iron cramps between the marble blocks of its cornice helped to reduce outward thrusts at the base and limit cracking, like the wooden tension rings used in other Byzantine brick domes. The dome and pendentives are supported by four large arches springing from four piers. Additionally, two huge semi-domes of similar proportion are placed on opposite sides of the central dome and themselves contain smaller semi-domes between an additional four piers. The Hagia Sophia, as both the cathedral of Constantinople and the church of the adjacent Great Palace of Constantinople, has a form of octagonal plan.

In Constantinople, Justinian also tore down the aging Church of the Holy Apostles and rebuilt it on a grander scale between 536 and 550. The original building was a cruciform basilica with a central domed mausoleum. Justinian's replacement was apparently likewise cruciform but with a central dome and four flanking domes. The central dome over the crossing had pendentives and windows in its base, while the four domes over the arms of the cross had pendentives but no windows. The domes appear to have been radically altered between 944 and 985 by the addition of windowed drums beneath all five domes and by raising the central dome higher than the others. The second most important church in the city after the Hagia Sophia, it fell into disrepair after the Latin occupation of Constantinople between 1204 and 1261 and it was razed to the ground by Mehmed the Conqueror in 1461 to build his Fatih Mosque on the site. Justinian's Basilica of St. John at Ephesus and Venice's St Mark's Basilica are derivative of Holy Apostles. More loosely, the Cathedral of St. Front and the Basilica of Saint Anthony of Padua are also derived from this church.

Justinian and his successors modernized frontier fortifications throughout the century. The example at Qasr ibn Wardan (564) in the desert of eastern Syria is particularly impressive, containing a governor's palace, barracks, and a church built with techniques and to plans possibly imported from Constantinople. The church dome is unusual in that the pendentives sprang from an octagonal drum, rather than the four main arches, and in that it was made of brick, which was rare in Syria.

The Golden Triclinium, or Chrysotriklinos, of the Great Palace of Constantinople served as an audience hall for the Emperor as well as a palace chapel. Nothing of it has survived except descriptions, which indicate that it had a pumpkin dome containing sixteen windows in its webs and that the dome was supported by the arches of eight niches connecting to adjoining rooms in the building's likely circular plan. Alternatively, the building may have been octagonal in plan, rather than circular. The building was not free-standing and was located at the intersection of the public and private parts of the palace. Smaller windows filled with thin sheets of alabaster may have existed over each of the curtain-covered side niches and below the cornice at the base of the dome. The dome seems to have had webs that alternated straight and concave, like those of the dome of Justinian's Church of Saints Sergius and Bacchus, and may have been built about 40 years after that church. It was begun under Emperor Justin II, completed by his successor Tiberius II, and continued to be improved by subsequent rulers. It was connected to the imperial living quarters and was a space used for assembly before religious festivals, high promotions and consultations, as a banqueting hall, a chapel for the emperor, and a throne room. Never fully described in any of its frequent mentions in Byzantine texts, the room was restricted to members of the court and the "most highly rated foreigners". In the 10th century, the throne in the east niche chamber was directly below an icon of an enthroned Christ.

Other 6th century examples of domed constructions may include Nostra Segnora de Mesumundu in Siligo, Sardinia (before 534), Sant’Angelo in Perugia,  near San Donaci (6th or 7th century), and the Trigona of Cittadella near Noto (6th or 7th century).

Seventh century 
The period of Iconoclasm, roughly corresponding to the 7th to 9th centuries, is poorly documented but can be considered a transitional period. The cathedral of Sofia has an unsettled date of construction, ranging from the last years of Justinian to the middle of the 7th century, as the Balkans were lost to the Slavs and Bulgars. It combines a barrel-vaulted cruciform basilica plan with a crossing dome hidden externally by the drum. It resembles some Romanesque churches of later centuries, although the type would not be popular in later Byzantine architecture.

Destruction by earthquakes or invaders in the seventh to ninth centuries seems to have encouraged the development of masonry domes and vaulting experimentation over basilicas in Anatolia. The Sivrihisar Kizil Kilise has a dome over an octagonal drum with windows on a square platform and was built around 600, before the battles in the region in the 640s. The domed Church of Mary in Ephesus may have been built in the late sixth or first half of the seventh century with reused bricks. The smaller Church of the Dormition of the Monastery of Hyacinth in Nicaea had a dome supported on four narrow arches and dates prior to 727. The lobed dome of the Church of St. Clement at Ancyra was supported by pendentives that also included squinch-like arches, a possible indication of unfamiliarity with pendentives by the builders. The upper portion of the Church of St. Nicholas at Myra was destroyed, but it had a dome on pendentives over the nave that might have been built between 602 and 655, although it has been attributed to the late eighth or early ninth centuries.

Eighth century 
Part of the fifth-century basilica of St. Mary at Ephesus seems to have been rebuilt in the eighth century as a cross-domed church, a development typical of the seventh to eighth centuries and similar to the cross-domed examples of Hagia Sophia in Thessaloniki, St. Nicholas at Myra, St. Clement's at Ankara, and the church of the Koimesis at Nicaea.

With the decline in the empire's resources following losses in population and territory, domes in Byzantine architecture were used as part of more modest new buildings. The large-scale churches of Byzantium were, however, kept in good repair. The upper portion of the Church of Hagia Irene was thoroughly rebuilt after the 740 Constantinople earthquake. The nave was re-covered with an elliptical domical vault hidden externally by a low cylinder on the roof, in place of the earlier barrel vaulted ceiling, and the original central dome from the Justinian era was replaced with one raised upon a high windowed drum. The barrel vaults supporting these two new domes were also extended out over the side aisles, creating cross-domed units. By bracing the dome with broad arches on all four sides, the cross-domed unit provided a more secure structural system. These units, with most domes raised on drums, became a standard element on a smaller scale in later Byzantine church architecture, and all domes built after the transitional period were braced with bilateral symmetry. The dome over the Church of the Archangels at Sige was replaced in the 19th century, but the original was dated in the 18th century to 780.

A small, unisex monastic community in Bithynia, near Constantinople, may have developed the cross-in-square plan church during the Iconoclastic period, which would explain the plan's small scale and unified naos. The ruined church of St. John at Pelekete monastery is an early example. Monks had supported the use of icons, unlike the government-appointed secular clergy, and monasticism would become increasingly popular. A new type of privately funded urban monastery developed from the 9th century on, which may help to explain the small size of subsequent building.

Ninth century 
Timber-roofed basilicas, which had been the standard form until the 6th century, would be displaced by domed churches from the 9th century onward. In the Middle Byzantine period (c. 843 – 1204), domes were normally built to emphasize separate functional spaces, rather than as the modular ceiling units they had been earlier. Resting domes on circular or polygonal drums pierced with windows eventually became the standard style, with regional characteristics.

The cross-in-square plan, with a single dome at the crossing or five domes in a quincunx pattern, became widely popular in the Middle Byzantine period. Examples include an early 9th century church in Tirilye, now called the Fatih Mosque. The Nea Ekklesia of Emperor Basil I was built in Constantinople around 880 as part of a substantial building renovation and construction program during his reign. It had five domes, which are known from literary sources, but different arrangements for them have been proposed under at least four different plans. One has the domes arranged in a cruciform pattern like those of the contemporaneous Church of St. Andrew at Peristerai or the much older Church of the Holy Apostles in Constantinople. Others arrange them in a quincunx pattern, with four minor domes in the corners of a square and a larger fifth in the center, as part of a cross-domed or cross-in-square plan. It is often suggested that the five-domed design of St. Panteleimon at Nerezi, from 1164, is based on that of the Nea Ekklesia.

Tenth century 

In the Middle Byzantine period, more complex plans emerge, such as the integrated chapels of Theotokos of Lips, a monastic church in Constantinople that was built around 907. It included four small chapels on its second floor gallery level that may have been domed.

The cross-in-square is the most common church plan from the 10th century until the fall of Constantinople in 1453. For domes beyond that width, variations in the plan were required such as using piers in place of the columns and incorporating further buttressing around the core of the building.

The palace chapel of the Myrelaion in Constantinople was built around 920 as a cross-in-square church and remains a good example. The earliest cross-in-square in Greece is the Panagia church at the monastery of Hosios Loukas, dated to the late 10th century, but variations of the type can be found from southern Italy to Russia and Anatolia. They served in a wide variety of church roles, including domestic, parish, monastic, palatial, and funerary.

The distinctive rippling eaves design for the roofs of domes began in the 10th century. In mainland Greece, circular or octagonal drums became the most common.

Eleventh century 

In Constantinople, drums with twelve or fourteen sides were popular beginning in the 11th century. The 11th century rock-cut churches of Cappadocia, such as Karanlik Kilise and Elmali Kilise in Göreme, have shallow domes without drums due to the dim natural lighting of cave interiors.

The domed-octagon plan is a variant of the cross-in-square plan. This hemispherical dome was built without a drum and supported by a remarkably open structural system, with the weight of the dome distributed on eight piers, rather than four, and corbelling used to avoid concentrating weight on their corners. The use of squinches to transition from those eight supports to the base of the dome has led to speculation of a design origin in Arab, Sasanian, or Caucasian architecture, although with a Byzantine interpretation. Similar openness in design was used in the earlier Myrelaion church, as originally built, but the katholikon of Hosios Loukas is perhaps the most sophisticated design since the Hagia Sophia. The smaller monastic church at Daphni, c. 1080, uses a simpler version of this plan.

The transition from the square naos to the round base of the drum is accomplished by eight conches, with those above the flat sides of the naos being relatively shallow and those in the corners of the being relatively narrow. The novelty of this technique in Byzantine architecture has led to it being dubbed the "island octagon" type, in contrast to the "mainland octagon" type of Hosios Loukas. Speculation on design influences have ranged from Arab influence transmitted via the recently built domed octagon chapels at the Church of the Holy Sepulchre in Jerusalem or the Al-Hakim Mosque in Islamic Cairo, to Caucasian buildings such as the Armenian Cathedral of the Holy Cross. Later copies of the Nea Moni, with alterations, include the churches of Agios Georgios Sykousis, Agioi Apostoli at Pyrghi, Panagia Krina, and the Church of the Metamorphosis in Chortiatis.

Twelfth century 

The larger scale of some Byzantine buildings of the 12th century required a more stable support structure for domes than the four slender columns of the cross-in-square type could provide. A variant of the cross-in-square, the "so-called atrophied Greek cross plan", also provides greater support for a dome than the typical cross-in-square plan by using four piers projecting from the corners of an otherwise square naos, rather than four columns. This design was used in the Chora Church of Constantinople in the 12th century after the previous cross-in-square structure was destroyed by an earthquake.

The 12th century Pantokrator monastic complex (1118–36) was built with imperial sponsorship as three adjoining churches. The south church, a cross-in-square, has a ribbed dome over the naos, domical vaults in the corners, and a pumpkin dome over the narthex gallery. The north church is also a cross-in-square plan. The middle church, the third to be built, fills the long space between the two earlier churches with two oval domes of the pumpkin and ribbed types over what appear to be separate functional spaces. The western space was an imperial mausoleum, whereas the eastern dome covered a liturgical space.

There is a written account by Nicholas Mesarites of a Persian-style muqarnas dome built as part of a late 12th century imperial palace in Constantinople. Called the "Mouchroutas Hall", it may have been built as part of an easing in tensions between the court of Manuel I Komnenos and Kilij Arslan II of the Sultanate of Rum around 1161, evidence of the complex nature of the relations between the two states. The account, written by Nicholas Mesarites shortly before the Fourth Crusade, is part of a description of the coup attempt by John Komnenos in 1200, and may have been mentioned as a rhetorical device to disparage him.

Thirteenth century 

The Late Byzantine Period, from 1204 to 1453, has an unsettled chronology of buildings, especially during the Latin Occupation. The fragmentation of the empire, beginning in 1204, is reflected in a fragmentation of church design and regional innovations.

The church of Hagia Sophia in the Empire of Trebizond dates to between 1238 and 1263 and has a variation on the quincunx plan. Heavy with traditional detailing from Asia Minor, and possibly Armenian or Georgian influence, the brick pendentives and drum of the dome remain Byzantine.

After 1261, new church architecture in Constantinople consisted mainly of additions to existing monastic churches, such as the Monastery of Lips and Pammakaristos Church, and as a result the building complexes are distinguished in part by an asymmetric array of domes on their roofs. This effect may have been in imitation of the earlier triple-church Pantokrator monastic complex.

In the Despotate of Epirus, the Church of the Parigoritissa (1282–9) is the most complex example, with a domed octagon core and domed ambulatory. Built in the capital of Arta, its external appearance resembles a cubic palace. The upper level narthex and galleries have five domes, with the middle dome of the narthex an open lantern. This Greek-cross octagon design, similar to the earlier example at Daphni, is one of several among the various Byzantine principalities. Another is found in the Hagia Theodoroi at Mistra (1290–6).

Fourteenth and fifteenth centuries 

Mistra was ruled from Constantinople after 1262, then was the suzerain of the Despotate of the Morea from 1348 to 1460. In Mistra, there are several basilica plan churches with domed galleries that create a five-domed cross-in-square over a ground-level basilica plan. The Aphentiko at Brontochion Monastery was built c. 1310–22 and the later church of the Pantanassa Monastery (1428) is of the same type. The Aphentiko may have been originally planned as a cross-in-square church, but has a blend of longitudinal and central plan components, with an interior divided into nave and aisles like a basilica. The barrel-vaulted nave and cross arms have a dome at their crossing, and the corner bays of the galleries are also domed to form a quincunx pattern. A remodeling of the Metropolis church in Mistra created an additional example. The Pantanassa incorporates Western elements in that domes in its colonnaded porch are hidden externally, and its domes have ribs of rectangular section similar to those of Salerno, Ravello, and Palermo.

In Thessaloniki, a distinctive type of church dome developed in the first two decades of the 14th century. It is characterized by a polygonal drum with rounded colonnettes at the corners, all brick construction, and faces featuring three arches stepped back within one another around a narrow "single-light window". One of the hallmarks of Thessalonian churches was the plan of a domed naos with a peristoon wrapped around three sides. The churches of Hagios Panteleimon, Hagia Aikaterine, and Hagioi Apostoloi have domes on these ambulatory porticoes. The five domes of the Hagioi Apostoloi, or Church of the Holy Apostles, in Thessaloniki (c. 1329) makes it an example of a five-domed cross-in-square church in the Late Byzantine style, as is the Gračanica monastery, built around 1311 in Serbia. The architect and artisans of the Gračanica monastery church probably came from Thessaloniki and its style reflects Byzantine cultural influence. The church has been said to represent "the culmination of Late Byzantine architectural design."

A 15th century account of a Russian traveler to Constantinople mentions an abandoned hall, presumably domed, "in which the sun, the moon, and the stars succeeded each other as in heaven."

Influence

Armenia 
Constantinople's cultural influence extended from Sicily to Russia. Armenia, as a border state between the Roman-Byzantine and Sasanian empires, was influenced by both. The exact relationship between Byzantine architecture and that of the Caucasus is unclear. Georgia and Armenia produced many central planned, domed buildings in the 7th century and, after a lull during the Arab invasions, the architecture flourished again in the Middle Byzantine Period. Armenian church domes were initially wooden structures. Etchmiadzin Cathedral (c. 483) originally had a wooden dome covered by a wooden pyramidal roof before this was replaced with stone construction in 618. Churches with stone domes became the standard type after the 7th century, perhaps benefiting from a possible exodus of stonecutters from Syria, but the long traditions of wooden construction carried over stylistically. Some examples in stone as late as the 12th century are detailed imitations of clearly wooden prototypes. Armenian church building was prolific in the late 6th and 7th centuries and, by the 7th century, the churches tend to be either central plans or combinations of central and longitudinal plans. Domes were supported by either squinches (which were used in the Sasanian Empire but rarely in the Byzantine) or pendentives like those of the Byzantine empire, and the combination of domed-cross plan with the hall-church plan could have been influenced by the architecture of Justinian. Domes and cross arms were added to the longitudinal cathedral of Dvin from 608 to 615 and a church in Tekor. Other domed examples include Ptghnavank in Ptghni (c. 600), a church in T'alinn (662-85), the Cathedral of Mren (629-40), and the Mastara Church (9th and 10th centuries). An 11th century Armenian source names an Armenian architect, Trdat, as responsible for the rebuilding of the dome of Hagia Sophia in Constantinople after the 989 earthquake caused a partial collapse of the central dome. Although squinches were the more common supporting system used to support Armenian domes, pendentives are always used beneath the domes attributed to Trdat, which include the 10th century monasteries of Marmasen, Sanahin, and Halpat, as well as the patriarchal cathedral of Argina (c. 985), the Cathedral of Ani (989-1001), and the palace chapel of King Gagik II (c. 1001-1005).

The Balkans 
In the Balkans, where Byzantine rule weakened in the 7th and 8th centuries, domed architecture may represent Byzantine influence or, in the case of the centrally planned churches of 9th-century Dalmatia, the revival of earlier Roman mausoleum types. An interest in Roman models may have been an expression of the religious maneuvering of the region between the Church of Constantinople and that of Rome. Examples include the Church of Sv. Luka in Kotor, the Church of Sv. Trojce near Split, and the early 9th century Church of Sv. Donat in Zadar. The Church of Sv. Donat, originally domed, may have been built next to a palace and resembles palace churches in the Byzantine tradition. The architectural chronology of the central and eastern Balkans is unsettled during the period of the First Bulgarian Empire, in part because of similarity between Justinian-era churches from the 6th century and what may have been a revival of that style in the late 9th and early 10th centuries under the Christianized Bulgarian tsars. Remains of the Round Church in Preslav, a building traditionally associated with the rule Tsar Simeon (893–927), indicate that it was a domed palace chapel. Its construction features, however, resemble instead 3rd and 4th century Roman mausolea, perhaps due to the association of those structures with the imperial idea.

The Rus' 
Byzantine architecture was introduced to the Rus' people in the 10th century, with churches after the conversion of Prince Vladimir of Kiev being modeled after those of Constantinople, but made of wood. The Russian onion dome was a later development. The earliest architecture of Kiev, the vast majority of which was made of wood, has been lost to fire, but by the 12th century masonry domes on low drums in Kiev and Vladimir-Suzdal were little different than Byzantine domes, although modified toward the "helmet" type with a slight point. The Cathedral of St. Sophia in Kiev (1018–37) was distinctive in having thirteen domes, for Jesus and the Twelve Apostles, but they have since been remodeled in the Baroque style and combined with an additional eight domes. The pyramidal arrangement of the domes was a Byzantine characteristic, although, as the largest and perhaps most important 11th century building in the Byzantine tradition, many of the details of this building have disputed origins. Bulbous onion domes on tall drums were a development of northern Russia, perhaps due to the demands of heavy ice and snowfall along with the more rapid innovation permitted by the Novgorod region's emphasis on wooden architecture. The central dome of the Cathedral of St. Sophia (1045–62) in Novgorod dates from the 12th century and shows a transitional stage. Other churches built around this time are those of St. Nicholas (1113), the Nativity of the Virgin (1117), and St. George (1119–30).

Romanesque Europe 
In Norman Sicily, architecture was a fusion of Byzantine, Islamic, and Romanesque forms, but the dome of the Palatine Chapel (1132–43) at Palermo was decorated with Byzantine mosaic, as was that of the church of Santa Maria dell'Ammiraglio (1140s). The unusual use of domes on pendentives in a series of seventy Romanesque churches in the Aquitaine region of France strongly suggests a Byzantine influence. St. Mark's Basilica was modeled on the now-lost Byzantine Church of the Holy Apostles in Constantinople, and Périgueux Cathedral in Aquitaine (c. 1120) likewise has five domes on pendentives in a Greek cross arrangement.

Orthodox Africa and Europe 
The Throne Hall of Dongola, built in the 9th century at Old Dongola, was used by the kings of Makuria, the most powerful kingdom in medieval Africa, for 450 years until 1317. The upper floor contained a likely cruciform room with a small dome at the center, in imitation of the audience halls of the Byzantine emperors. Bulgarian tsars had similar halls.

Byzantium's neighboring Orthodox powers in Europe emerged as architectural centers in their own right during the Late Byzantine Period. The Bulgarian churches of Nesebar are similar to those in Constantinople at this time. The style and vaulting in the Nesebar cross-in-square churches of Christ Pantocrator and St John Aliturgetos, for example, are similar to examples in Constantinople. Following the construction of Gračanica monastery, the architecture of Serbia used the "so-called Athonite plan", for example at Ravanica (1375–7). In Romania, Wallachia was influenced by Serbian architecture and Moldavia was more original, such as in the Voroneț Monastery with its small dome. Moscow emerged as the most important center of architecture following the fall of Constantinople in 1453. The Cathedral of the Assumption (1475–79), built in the Kremlin to house the icon of Our Lady of Vladimir, was designed in a traditional Russian style by an Italian architect.

Italian Renaissance 
Italian Renaissance architecture combined Roman and Romanesque practices with Byzantine structures and decorative elements, such as domes with pendentives over square bays. The Cassinese Congregation used windowed domes in the Byzantine style, and often also in a quincunx arrangement, in their churches built between 1490 and 1546, such as the Abbey of Santa Giustina. The technique of using wooden tension rings at several levels within domes and drums to resist deformation, frequently said to be a later invention of Filippo Brunelleschi, was common practice in Byzantine architecture. The technique of using double shells for domes, although revived in the Renaissance, originated in Byzantine practice. The dome of the Pantheon, as a symbol of Rome and its monumental past, was particularly celebrated and imitated, although copied only loosely. Studied in detail from the early Renaissance on, it was an explicit point of reference for the dome of St. Peter's Basilica and inspired the construction of domed rotundas with temple-front porches throughout western architecture into the modern era. Examples include Palladio's chapel at Maser (1579–80), Bernini's church of S. Maria dell'Assunzione (1662-4), the Library Rotunda of the University of Virginia (1817–26), and the church of St. Mary in Malta (1833–60). Other examples include the church of San Simeone Piccolo in Venice (1718–38), the church of Gran Madre di Dio in Turin (1818–31), and the church of San Francesco di Paola, Naples in Naples (19th century).

Ottoman Empire 
Ottoman architecture adopted the Byzantine dome form and continued to develop it. One type of mosque was modeled after Justinian's Church of Sergius and Bacchus with a dome over an octagon or hexagon contained within a square, such as the Üç Şerefeli Mosque (1437–47). The dome and semi-domes of the Hagia Sophia, in particular, were replicated and refined. A "universal mosque design" based upon this development spread throughout the world. The first Ottoman mosque to use a dome and semi-dome nave vaulting scheme like that of Hagia Sophia was the mosque of Beyazit II. Only two others were modeled similarly: Kılıç Ali Pasha Mosque and the Süleymaniye Mosque (1550–57). Other Ottoman mosques, although superficially similar to Hagia Sophia, have been described as structural criticisms of it. When Mimar Sinan set out to build a dome larger than that of Hagia Sophia with Selimiye Mosque (1569–74), he used a more stable octagonal supporting structure. The Selimiye Mosque is of the type originating with the Church of Sergius and Bacchus. Three other Imperial mosques in Istanbul built in this "Classical Style" of Hagia Sophia include four large semi-domes around the central dome, rather than two: Şehzade Camii, Sultan Ahmed I Camii (completed in 1616), and the last to be built: Yeni Cami (1597–1663).

Modern revival 
A Byzantine revival style of architecture occurred in the 19th and 20th centuries. An early example of the revival style in Russia was the Cathedral of Christ the Saviour (1839–84), which was approved by the Tsar to be a model for other churches in the empire. The style's popularity spread through scholarly publications produced after the independence of Greece and the Balkans from the Ottoman Empire. It was used throughout Europe and North America, peaking in popularity between 1890 and 1914. The Greek Orthodox St Sophia's Cathedral (1877–79) and Roman Catholic Westminster Cathedral (begun 1895), both in London, are examples. The throne room of Neuschwanstein Castle (1885–86) was built by King Ludwig II in Bavaria. In the late 19th century, the Hagia Sophia became a widespread model for Greek Orthodox churches. In southeastern Europe, monumental national cathedrals built in the capital cities of formerly Ottoman areas used Neo-Classical or Neo-Byzantine styles. Sofia's Alexander Nevsky Cathedral and Belgrade's Church of Saint Sava are examples, and used Hagia Sophia as a model due to their large sizes. Synagogues in the United States were built in a variety of styles, as they had been in Europe (and often with a mixture of elements from different styles), but the Byzantine Revival style was the most popular in the 1920s. Domed examples include The Temple of Cleveland (1924), the synagogue of KAM Isaiah Israel (1924) in Chicago, based upon San Vitale in Ravenna and Hagia Sophia in Istanbul, and the synagogue of Congregation Emanu-El (1926) in San Francisco.

In the United States, Greek Orthodox churches beginning in the 1950s tended to use a large central dome with a ring of windows at its base evocative of the central dome of Hagia Sophia, rather than more recent or more historically common Byzantine types, such as the Greek-cross-octagon or five-domed quincunx plans. Examples include Annunciation Greek Orthodox Church, completed in 1961 but designed by Frank Lloyd Wright in 1957, Ascension Greek Orthodox Cathedral of Oakland (1960), and Annunciation Greek Orthodox Cathedral in Atlanta (1967). The use of a large central dome in American Greek Orthodox churches continued in the 1960s and 1970s before moving toward smaller Middle Byzantine domes, or versions of Early Christian basilicas.

See also 

 List of Roman domes
 History of architecture

References

Citations

Sources 

 
 
 
 
 
 
 
 
 
 
 
 
 
 
 
 
 
 
 
 
 
 
 
 
 
 
 
 
 
 
 
 
 
 
 
 
 
 
 
 
 
 
 
 
 
 
 
 
 
 
 
 
 
 
 
 
 
 
 
 
 
 
 
 
 
 
 
 
 
 
 
 
 
 
 
 
 
 
 
 
 
 
 
 
 
 
 
 
 
 
 
 
 
 
 
 
 
 
 
 
 
 
 
 
 
 
 
 
 
 
 
 
 
 
 
 
 
 
 

Ancient Roman architectural elements
Byzantine architecture
Domes
History of structural engineering